Ekeh Chiaka Joseph (born November 28) known professionally as Majeeed is a Nigerian Afropop Singer, and Songwriter signed to Dream Empire Music. He is known for his breakthrough single "Yawa No Dey End", released in 2022 as the lead single off his extended play Bitter Sweet. On 29 April 2022, a new version of "Yawa No Dey End", was released with Joeboy, through Dream Empire Music, and emPawa Africa, which peaked at number 41 on the Nigeria TurnTable Top 50 chart, on the week of May 9, 2022.

He was cited as one of the 10 African Artists You Should Know by Audiomack, after he surpassed 1 million streams in April 2022. On 11 July 2022, "Yawa No Dey End" debuted on the newly launched TurnTable Top 100, an expansion of the Top 50, at number 59. On 13 July 2022, following the initial launch of the TurnTable Top Afro-Pop Songs chart, "Yawa No Dey End" debuted at number 30. On 16 July 2022, he was cited as one of the artists on the initial issue of the TurnTable Artiste Top 100 chart, and debuted at number 80. And later on he got an opportunity to do a remix of that song with Joeboy, one of the biggest artist in Nigeria.

Early life
Ekeh Chiaka Joseph was born on November 28 in Lagos to Nze Oliver and Nze Grace. He hails from Imo, a state in the south east region of Nigeria. He relocated to Ogun State at the age of eight. He had his primary education at Iyana Ipaja, in Lagos State, and his secondary education in Ogun State, before proceeding to Cotonou, for his tertiary education at Iscom University Benin, where he graduated with a B.Sc in Mass Communication. On 6 February 2022, he tell's Ayo Makinde, and Alero Edu on Sunrise, "I started music, while I was in secondary school; in JSS2, that time I use to kolobi my mom's money to go to the studio, and just make music."

Career
Majeeed began his music career as a songwriter to Seyi Shay. In 2020, he released two promotional singles, titled "Gee For Life", and "Rocky Lo", which features Seyi Shay. "Rocky Lo" was made available for free downloads. Late 2020, he began learning music production. In February 2022, he told Vangaurd, "I produced 'Time' at Harrysong's house." On 19 February 2021, Majeeed released "Time", as the first single off Bitter Sweeet ep, which peaked at number 8 on Apple Music in Nigeria, and number 10 in Mauritius.

In the second quarter of 2021,he signed a record deal with Dream Empire Music on 20 August, and was on the line-up for the 2021 edition of the Felabration, held at New Afrika Shrine on October 11. At Big Girl listening party on November 20, 2021, Seyi Shay called out Majeeed, as the primary writer of Big Girl studio album. She said, "I don tell everybody, say you write all the songs, way they for this album". He opened for BNXN (formerly Buju) at Buju Live in Concert in Lagos, held on 22 December 2021.

On 6 January 2022, he released an acoustic version of "Time", as his first official single under Dream Empire Music. He achieved mainstream with "Yawa No Dey End", a record co-signed by Don Jazzy, and Tiwa Savage. On 16 April 2022, he covered Pulse Nigeria Future Sounds playlist. and re-released "Yawa No Dey End" with Joeboy, through emPawa on 29 April 2022. It debut at number 41 on TurnTable Top 50. On 3 May 2022, he was cited as one of the Best New Artists, by The Native, among other African artists.

On 7 May 2022, he opened for Reminisce, CDQ, and Terry Apala at Urban Live, a music concert curated by Urban96 Radio Network monthly. On 26 June 2022, he was on the line-up of Funbi's Bus, The Journey So Far edition, and Mainland Block Party, Music is Life edition, alongside Ice Prince, Blaqbonez, and Toby Shang. On 2 July 2022, he released the official music video for "No Room For Love", directed by Olu the Wave, and featured a cameo appearance from Sylvia Adora, a Nigerian actress known for her role in Papa Benji.

On 27 July 2022, he was named Apple Music 'Up Next' Artist in Nigeria. On 30 July 2022, Majeeed sold-out his first solo international concert in Mauritius, named after the most played song on his ep in Mauritius, "Smile For Me". On 1 August 2022, "Smile For Me" reached number one on Mauritius Apple Music Top Songs. On 5 August 2022, "No Room For Love" debut on TurnTable. It peaked at number 11 on Bubbling Under Top 100, number 14 on Top Afro-R&B Songs and number 9 on NXT Emerging Top Songs.

Artistry
Majeeed is known for fusing Afrobeats. He tells Chinonso Ihekire of The Guardian, "I came up with the name five years ago, and chose to use the name, because it embodies my attributes as a person. Majeed means noble, or magnificent, in Arabic". He cited Tope Alabi, Chief Osadebe, Oliver De Coque, and Baba Ara, as his early musical influence. On 9 March 2022, he spoke about his music journey, and personal life, aside being an artiste, songwriter, and an aspiring producer, on Television Continental program E-Splash.

Discography

EPs

Singles

Other charted songs

Promotional singles

Guest appearances

Songwriting credits

Notes

References 

Living people
English-language singers from Nigeria
Nigerian pop singers
Nigerian rhythm and blues singers
21st-century Nigerian male singers
Year of birth missing (living people)